Rotten Tomatoes Movieclips (formerly Movieclips and later Fandango Movieclips) is a company located in Venice, Los Angeles that offers streaming video of movie clips and trailers from such Hollywood film companies as Universal Pictures, Metro-Goldwyn-Mayer, Paramount Pictures, Warner Bros. (including content from subsidiaries New Line Cinema and Castle Rock Entertainment), Sony Pictures (including content from subsidiaries Destination Films, Sony Pictures Classics, and Triumph Pictures), along with other studios such as Lionsgate Films and DreamWorks.

History 

Movieclips was founded in 2009 as a division of online video company Zefr, as a web database which let you search through a library of over 12,000 movie clips.
The company's goal was to promote the discovery of movies. In partnership with Google and funding lead by MK Capital, Movieclips uploaded over 20,000 clips in 2011 to YouTube from movies chosen by a team of content curators. In 2014, Movieclips was acquired by Fandango and was renamed "Fandango Movieclips." Fandango Movieclips was then rebranded to "Rotten Tomatoes Movieclips" in summer of 2022 to further establish the channel's reliable use for movie clips and trailers using the recognition associated with the Rotten Tomatoes website.

Most-viewed clips 
The following table lists the top 3 most-viewed videos on YouTube, with each total rounded to the nearest 10 million views, uploader and upload date.

References

External links 
 
 
 

American entertainment websites
American film websites
Movieclips
Internet properties established in 2009
Video on demand services